The Leopard for Best Actress is an award given at the Locarno International Film Festival. It was first awarded in 1946.

Award winners

References

External links
 

Swiss film awards
Lists of films by award
Locarno Festival
Awards for actresses